
The second Dibbs ministry was the 25th ministry of the Colony of New South Wales, and was the second of three occasions of being led by the tenth Premier, George Dibbs. Dibbs was elected to the New South Wales Legislative Assembly in 1874.
In a period of great financial stress for the Colony, this ministry covers just 49 days from 17 January 1889 until 7 March 1889. Dibbs took over as Premier on the first occasion in October 1885 following resignation of the Alexander Stuart due to ill-health, with his ministry lasting for 75 days. Dibbs served as Colonial Secretary in the Jennings ministry, before it too suffered budgetary pressures. It was during this time that the party system was formed in New South Wales with Sir Henry Parkes leading the Free Trade Party. Dibbs had been elected as an independent free trader, however his opposition to Parkes caused Dibbs to align himself with the Protectionist Party. Dibbs had assumed office when Parkes lost a vote on the floor of the Assembly. Parliament was dissolved on 19 January 1889 and an election was held in February. There was a significant swing to the Protectionists, gaining 29 seats, however it was insufficient to command a majority of the Legislative Assembly and Parkes resumed the premiership.

Under the constitution, ministers in the Legislative Assembly were required to resign to recontest their seats in an election when appointed. On this occasion however no by-elections were required as the ministers had all been appointed prior to the general election.

Composition of ministry

Ministers were members of the Legislative Assembly unless otherwise noted.

See also

Notes

References

 

New South Wales ministries
1889 establishments in Australia
1889 disestablishments in Australia